John Milton Younge (born July 19, 1955) is a United States district judge of the United States District Court for the Eastern District of Pennsylvania.

Biography 

Younge received his Bachelor of Science in 1977 from Boston University, his Juris Doctor in 1981 from Howard University School of Law, and a Master of Judicial Studies in 2011 from the University of Nevada, Reno.  He began his legal career as a solo practitioner in Philadelphia from 1982 to 1985. From 1985 to 1995, Younge worked at the Philadelphia Redevelopment Authority, serving as Deputy Executive Director and subsequently as General Counsel from 1991 to 1995. From 1996 to 2019, Younge was a Judge on the Philadelphia County Court of Common Pleas, where he presided over both criminal and civil cases. Younge served on the Ward Executive Committee with the Philadelphia Democratic Party since 1984, when he served on the Ward Executive Committee for the Party. Younge won election to the bench as a Democrat and ran twice unsuccessfully as a Democrat for the Pennsylvania Superior Court.

Federal judicial service

Expired nomination to district court under Obama 

On July 30, 2015, President Obama nominated Younge to serve as a United States District Judge of the United States District Court for the Eastern District of Pennsylvania, to the seat vacated by Judge Mary A. McLaughlin, who assumed senior status on November 18, 2013. He received a hearing before the Senate Judiciary Committee on December 9, 2015. His nomination expired on January 3, 2017, with the end of the 114th Congress.

Renomination to district court under Trump 

On July 13, 2018, President Donald Trump announced his intent to nominate Younge to a seat on the United States District Court for the Eastern District of Pennsylvania. On July 17, 2018, his nomination was sent to the Senate. President Trump re-nominated Younge to the same seat to which President Obama had previously nominated him.

On January 3, 2019, his nomination was returned to the President under Rule XXXI, Paragraph 6 of the United States Senate. On January 23, 2019, President Trump announced his intent to renominate Younge for a federal judgeship. His nomination was sent to the Senate later that day. On February 7, 2019, his nomination was reported out of committee by a 15–7 vote with the seven negative votes coming from Republicans. On July 31, 2019, the Senate confirmed his nomination by voice vote. He received his judicial commission on August 20, 2019.

See also 
 Barack Obama judicial appointment controversies
 List of African-American federal judges
 List of African-American jurists

References

External links 
 

1955 births
Living people
20th-century American lawyers
20th-century American judges
21st-century American lawyers
21st-century American judges
African-American lawyers
African-American judges
Boston University alumni
Howard University School of Law alumni
Judges of the Pennsylvania Courts of Common Pleas
Judges of the United States District Court for the Eastern District of Pennsylvania
Lawyers from Philadelphia
Pennsylvania Democrats
United States district court judges appointed by Donald Trump
University of Nevada, Reno alumni